Merrion Hotel is a hotel in Dublin, Ireland,  which comprises a block of four terraced houses on Upper Merrion Street, built in the 1760s by Charles Monck, 1st Viscount Monck, for wealthy Irish merchants and nobility. He lived in No. 22, which became known as Monck House.  The first of these Georgian houses (No. 24), Mornington House, is the reputed birthplace of Arthur Wellesley, 1st Duke of Wellington. It is half owned by Lochlann Quinn.
The hotel also incorporates, as a separate business, Dublin's only 2-star Michelin restaurant, Restaurant Patrick Guilbaud.

References

External links 

Hotels in Dublin (city)
Georgian architecture in Ireland